The honorary citizen award is the highest decoration of Gyumri (former Leninakan) town, Armenia. Among the recipients are:

 Charles Aznavour, famous singer, songwriter and actor
 Robert Kocharian, President of Armenia
 Nikolai Ryzhkov, politician
 Mstislav Rostropovich, musician
 Valentina Tereshkova (1965)
 Martiros Sarian, painter (1964)
 Victor Ambartsumian, (1964)
 Hovhannes Bagramian, Marshal of the Soviet Union
 Aram Khachaturian, composer
 Tigran Petrosian, World Chess Champion (1966)
 Loris Tjeknavorian, Maestro                                                                                                  
 Aghasi Shaboyan, dancer
 Mariam Aslamazian, painter
 Gevorg Gharibjanian, historian
 Alexander Arutiunian, composer (2005)
 Edvard Mirzoian, composer (2005)

References 
Official list by Gyumri.am

Gyumri, Honorary Citizens of
Gyumri
Gyumri
Gyumri
Honorary citizens of Gyumri